Of Kingdom and Crown (stylized as ØF KINGDØM AND CRØWN) is the tenth studio album by American heavy metal band Machine Head, released on August 26, 2022, through Nuclear Blast and Imperium Recordings. It is the band's first album to feature guitarist Wacław Kiełtyka, who joined the band in late 2019. Matt Alston, who joined the band at the same time, does not play on the album; instead, drum duties are handled by Navene Koperweis, who acted as a session drummer for the album. The band's first concept album, Of Kingdom and Crown is set in a futuristic wasteland and revolves around two characters, Ares and Eros, who both go on their own respective killing sprees following the death of their loved ones.

Of Kingdom and Crown was positively received by critics, many who called it a return to form for Machine Head following the release of the band's oft-maligned ninth album Catharsis (2018), with praise being directed towards the album's diversity and musicianship, which was described as heavier and more technical than previous efforts.

Concept and lyrics 
Of Kingdom and Crown is the band's first concept album. The band's frontman, Robb Flynn, described the general plot of the album's concept to Blabbermouth;"The concept is set in a futuristic wasteland where the sky is always crimson red, and it's based around two characters. Character number one is named Ares [pronounced Aries], and he loses the love of his life, Amethyst, and goes on a murderous rampage against the people who killed her. Character number two is Eros [pronounced Arrows], who loses his mother to a drug overdose and, in his downward spiral, depression, becomes radicalized by this charismatic leader and goes on his own killing spree and is one of the people who killed Amethyst. And so the lyrics detail how their lives intertwine."The initial concept of Of Kingdom and Crown was described by Robb Flynn as "a very American story arc" where there was a good guy who won. While Flynn thought the concept was "good", he was unhappy with it when he found he was unable to connect to it emotionally. After watching the anime series Attack on Titan, which Flynn's two sons had got him and his family into during the COVID-19 pandemic, Flynn had a "total lightbulb going off", and rewrote the concept to make both of the protagonists antiheroes. Flynn wrote most of the album's lyrics "in his head", and at 3 a.m. "I just would set a timer for 20 minutes and I would just write anything that came to my mind — dumb shit, killer shit. I would just try and make everything rhyme; I would try and make a sequence out of it. And then I would just go back to bed and then wake up and look at it the next morning and then I would either sing it or try and mess around with it. And I think just doing it, kind of just chipping away at it like that every day, really helped the story come together." While most of the album's lyrics were written solely by Flynn, Jared McEachern and Wacław Kiełtyka also helped contribute to the lyrics and music, with McEachern and Flynn "bouncing" ideas off each other. Due to logistical problems caused by the COVID-19 pandemic, Matt Alston was unable to perform drum duties for the album, but recorded the album's demo tracks and also contributed some ideas to the album. In his place, Navene Koperweis acted as a session drummer for the album.

Plot summary 
Of Kingdom and Crowns first track, "Slaughter the Martyr", introduces the character of Ares. "This is Ares' origin story. He's just lost the love of his life [Amethyst] and now his life is just utter, unfettered revenge. It’s the only thing on his mind."

Eros, the second character of the story, spirals down into a deep depression after his mother has a fatal overdose and dies ("Overdose"/"My Hands are Empty"), eventually slipping into madness ("Unhallowed").

Reception 

Of Kingdom and Crown received critical acclaim from music critics.

Many publications hailed the album as a return to form for the band. Writing for Kerrang!, Dan Slessor praised the band's musical interplay and wrote "Machine Head have been down before – their nu-metal adventures 20-something years ago – and have come back from it, so maybe counting them out was premature. Regardless, with this version of the band they are back to their best, and that is all that matters." Simultaneously, it was also praised as for its diversity and advancement of the band's sound, which was described as heavier and more technical; Blabbermouth, who awarded the album a perfect 10/10 score, described Of Kingdom and Crown as "the greatest record Machine Head have ever made", writing; "the principle and performance remain the same — tight, brutal, precise — throughout what is easily this band's most vicious and punishing album yet."

Metal Injection gave the album a 9/10, writing "Despite its occasional stumble – it's another long album, with more than a little recognizable fat to be trimmed in tracks like 'No Gods, No Masters' – it's undoubtedly a career high point for the band and one that could be held up against The Blackening in comparison with very little complaint. The storytelling aspect works, and the music is top-notch and as heavy as Machine Head comes in places. What's not to love?"

Track listing 

Notes
 All tracks are stylized in all caps, and all letter O's are stylised as "Ø"

Personnel 
Machine Head
 Robb Flynn – lead vocals, rhythm guitar
 Wacław Kiełtyka – lead guitar
 Jared MacEachern – bass, backing vocals

Production and additional musicians
 Robb Flynn – production
 Zack Ohren – production, engineering
 Colin Richardson – mixing
 Chris Clancy – mixing, engineering
 Ted Jensen – mastering
 Navene Koperweis – drums
 Logan Mader – songwriting on "My Hands Are Empty"
 Seth Siro Anton – artwork

Charts

Release history

References 

2022 albums
Machine Head (band) albums